Trevenen Bal is a hamlet west of Trevenen in west Cornwall, England, United Kingdom.

References

Hamlets in Cornwall